Exuma Sound is a body of water in the Bahama Islands.

Exuma Sound lies southeast of New Providence Island and Eleuthera Island and west of Cat Island.

References

Bodies of water of the Bahamas
Sounds of North America